Antonio Leone may refer to:

Antonio Leone (politician)
Tony Leone (soccer)

See also
 Anthony Leone (disambiguation)
 Tony Leone (disambiguation)